Pedro Manuel Barata de Macedo Lima (20 April 1971 – 20 June 2020) was a Portuguese-Angolan actor, appearing in telenovelas in Portugal. He was also an Olympic swimmer.

Swimming
He represented Angola in 1988 and 1992 at the Summer Olympics.

Lima participated in several swimming contests but never advanced past preliminaries. In 1988, he was disqualified from the Men's 50 m freestyle, finished 62nd in the Men's 100 m freestyle, 42nd in the Men's 100 m butterfly. In 1992, Lima finished 43rd in the Men's 50 m freestyle and 53rd in the Men's 100 m butterfly. Lima also won a gold and bronze medal at the 1991 All-Africa Games, he won the gold medal in the Men's 50 m freestyle and a bronze in the Men's 100 m butterfly

As of 2018, Lima held two national records for Angola the 50 m freestyle record set at the 1991 All-Africa Games of 23.98 seconds and the 100 m backstroke record of 59.30 seconds.

Acting
After being invited to host a TV show about cinema called Magacine, he had roles in Portuguese soap operas like O Último Beijo, Ninguém como Tu, Fala-me de Amor, Ilha dos Amores and A Outra. He also starred in the 2009 movie Second Life.

Personal life
Lima was partner of model Anna Westerlund, with whom he had four children. He also had an adult son from a previous relationship with Patrícia Piloto.

Death
He reportedly sent out farewell messages to two acquaintances earlier on this day.

Filmography

References

External links
 

1971 births
2020 deaths
2020 suicides
Sportspeople from Luanda
Angolan male swimmers
Portuguese male butterfly swimmers
Portuguese male freestyle swimmers
Angolan people of Portuguese descent
Angolan expatriates in Portugal
Olympic swimmers of Angola
Swimmers at the 1988 Summer Olympics
Swimmers at the 1992 Summer Olympics
Angolan male actors
Portuguese male actors
African Games medalists in swimming
African Games gold medalists for Angola
African Games bronze medalists for Angola
Competitors at the 1991 All-Africa Games
Suicides by drowning
Suicides in Portugal
Portuguese people of Angolan descent